"You Really Got Me" is a song written by Ray Davies for English rock band the Kinks. The song, originally performed in a more blues-oriented style, was inspired by artists such as Lead Belly and Big Bill Broonzy. Two versions of the song were recorded, with the second performance being used for the final single. Although it was rumoured that future Led Zeppelin guitarist Jimmy Page had performed the song's guitar solo, the myth has since been proven false.

"You Really Got Me" was built around power chords (perfect fifths and octaves) and heavily influenced later rock musicians, particularly in the genres of heavy metal and punk rock. Built around a guitar riff played by Dave Davies, the song's lyrics were described by Dave as "a love song for street kids".

"You Really Got Me" was released in the UK on 4 August 1964 by Pye Records as the group's third single, and reached number one on the Record Retailer chart the following month, remaining there for two weeks. It was released in the US on 2 September by Reprise Records. The song became the group's breakthrough hit; it established them as one of the top British Invasion acts in the United States, reaching number seven there later in the year. "You Really Got Me" was later included on the Kinks' debut album, Kinks. American rock band Van Halen adapted the song for their 1978 self-titled debut album; it was released as their first single and peaked at No. 36 on the Billboard Hot 100.

Background

"You Really Got Me" was written by Ray Davies, the Kinks' vocalist and main songwriter, sometime between 9 and 12 March 1964. Created on the piano in the front room of the Davies' home, the song was stylistically very different from the finished product, being much lighter and somewhat jazz-oriented. Ray said of the song's writing, "When I came up with ['You Really Got Me'] I hadn't been writing songs very long at all. It was one of the first five I ever came up with."

Davies said that he had been inspired to write the song one night during his college days playing with the Dave Hunt Band, when he saw an attractive girl on the dance floor.  He said: "When we finished, I went off to find her, but she was gone and never returned to the club.  She really got me going."

During the spring of 1964, Ray Davies played an early version of "You Really Got Me" on piano to rock photographer Allan Ballard during a photo shoot. Ballard later remembered, "It was quite a small, pokey, Victorian Terrace, a bit scruffy, and in the hallway they had an upright piano. Ray sat down and plonked out, 'Der-der, der, Der-der!' He said, 'What do you reckon to this?' It meant nothing to me at the time, but it ended up as 'You Really Got Me'."

Ray, initially planning for the song to be a "more laid-back number", later played the chords of the song to brother Dave Davies, the Kinks' lead guitarist. However, upon hearing the track, Dave decided that the riff would be much more powerful on a guitar. Ray said of the track's change to a guitar-centred track, "I wanted it to be a jazz-type tune, because that's what I liked at the time. It's written originally around a sax line ... Dave ended up playing the sax line in fuzz guitar and it took the song a step further." The band then began to perform the new track in some of their live shows, where it was well received.

In 1998, Ray said, "I'd written 'You Really Got Me' as tribute to all those great blues people I love: Lead Belly and Big Bill Broonzy." Dave cited Gerry Mulligan as an inspiration, saying, "Ray was a great fan of Gerry Mulligan, who was in [the Jazz on a Summer's Day movie], and as he sat at the piano at home, he sort of messed around in a vein similar to Mulligan and came up with this figure based on a 12-bar blues". Dave has also said that song had been inspired by Jimmy Giuffre's song "The Train and the River". According to the band's manager, Larry Page, the song's characteristic riff came about while working out the chords of the Kingsmen's "Louie Louie". Lyrically, the song was said to be influenced by an encounter with one of the band's "first serious female fans".

Recording

The song was recorded by the Kinks at least twice in the summer of 1964. The band's demo was in a "bluesy" style, while a full studio version recorded in June was slower and less emphatic than the final single. Shel Talmy had, according to Davies, covered the track in reverb, all but burying the lead guitar. The band wanted to rerecord the song, but their record company Pye refused to fund another session on the grounds that the band's first two singles had failed to chart. Ray Davies, however, threatened that he would refuse to perform or promote the single unless it was re-recorded. Manager Larry Page also refused to publish the original recording. When Pye stood its ground, the band's own management broke the stalemate by funding the session themselves. Ray Davies' adamant attitude on behalf of the career-making song effectively established him as the leader and chief songwriter of the Kinks. Davies later said, "I was floundering around trying to find an identity. It was in 1964 that I managed to do that, to be able to justify myself and say, 'I exist, I'm here.' I was literally born when that song hit."

The influential distortion sound of the guitar track was created after guitarist Dave Davies sliced the speaker cone of his guitar amplifier with a razor blade and poked it with a pin. The amplifier was affectionately called "little green", after the name of the amplifier made by the Elpico company, and purchased in Davies' neighbourhood music shop, linked to a Vox AC-30. In 2014, Dave Davies accused brother Ray of lying about participating in Dave's guitar distortion sound. Dave wrote on his Facebook page, "My brother is lying. I don't know why he  does this but it was my Elpico amp that I bought and out of frustration I cut the speaker cone up with a razor blade and I was so shocked and surprised and excited that it worked that I demonstrated the sound to Ray and [Kinks bassist] Pete [Quaife]... Ray liked the sound and he had written a riff on the piano which formed the basis of the song 'You Really Got Me' and I played the riff on my guitar with my new sound. I alone created this sound."

According to recent Kinks' releases that give full official performance credits of the track, group members Ray Davies (vocals and rhythm guitar), Dave Davies (lead guitar), Pete Quaife (bass) are joined by session men Bobby Graham (drums), and Arthur Greenslade (piano). Regular Kinks drummer Mick Avory plays the tambourine.

Guitar solo
The guitar solo on the recording has been the subject of the persistent myth that it was not played by the Kinks' lead guitarist Dave Davies, but by then-session player Jimmy Page, who later joined the Yardbirds and Led Zeppelin. Among those claiming Page played lead guitar was Jon Lord of Deep Purple, who also claimed to play piano on the track. Page has always denied playing the song's guitar solo, going so far as to state in a 1970s interview cited in Sound on Sound magazine that "I didn't play on 'You Really Got Me' and that's what pisses him [Ray Davies] off." Rock historian and author Doug Hinman makes a case that the rumour was begun and fostered by the established British rhythm and blues community, many of whose members were resentful that an upstart band of teenagers such as the Kinks could produce such a powerful and influential blues-based recording, seemingly out of nowhere.

Shel Talmy, the producer on the track, has gone on record and put the controversy to rest in an interview with The Guardian, saying "contrary to myth, Jimmy didn't play on 'You Really Got Me'." In a 7 November 2014 interview with SiriusXM's Town Hall series, Page confirmed again that he did not play on the song, saying "Oh, Crikey! I wasn't on 'You Really Got Me,' but I did play on the Kinks' records. That's all I'm going to say about it. But every time I do an interview, people ask me about 'You Really Got Me.' So maybe somebody can correct Wikipedia so people won't keep asking me."

In his 1998 autobiographical release The Storyteller, Ray Davies discusses the guitar solo. He confirms that his brother Dave played the solo and it was preceded by some bantering between the two:

Music and lyrics

Commentators have described "You Really Got Me" as garage rock, hard rock, rock and roll, and proto-punk. While Ray Davies had been instructed at the time to write "Beatle-type" material for commercial reasons, "You Really Got Me" was written as a more R&B-based composition. The song is centred on a guitar riff by Dave Davies, which has since been referred to as "instantly identifiable". American musicologist Robert Walser described "You Really Got Me" as "the first hit song built around power chords." 

The song has since been labeled as an early influence of the heavy metal genre, with critic Denise Sullivan of AllMusic writing, You Really Got Me' remains a blueprint song in the hard rock and heavy metal arsenal." However, Dave Davies has since rejected the idea that the song is heavy metal, saying "I've never really like that term, heavy metal. I think, in all humility, it was the first heavy guitar riff rock record. Just because of the sound—if you played it on a ukulele, it might not have been so powerful."

The lyrics of the song are about lust and sex. Dave Davies said of the song's lyrics, You Really Got Me' [is] such a pure record, really. It's a love song for street kids. They're not going to wine and dine you, even if they knew how to chat you up. [They say] 'I want you—come here.

Release and reception
"You Really Got Me" was released as the band's third single on 4 August 1964, backed with "It's All Right" (also spelled "It's Alright"). Within three days of the single's release, "You Really Got Me" began to appear on local charts. Eventually, the song climbed to the top of the British charts, the band's first single to do so. Ray Davies later claimed that, due to the single's high demand, Pye Records put all their other records on hold to solely produce copies of "You Really Got Me". Due to the high level of success the single achieved in the UK, a rush-release of "You Really Got Me" was put out in the US on 2 September 1964, despite being delayed from its initial release date of 26 August. Although it did not enter the charts until 26 September, the record rose to number seven on the Billboard Hot 100. The song later appeared on the band's debut album, Kinks, with the title of the American release of the album being changed to You Really Got Me. Plans for Ray to sing versions of the song in French, German, Spanish, and Japanese for their respective markets were proposed by Shel Talmy, but they never materialized.  The single B-side, "It's All Right", was included on the UK EP Kinksize Hits (1964).  It was first issued on an album in the US, where it was included on the Kinks' third album Kinkdom (1965).  Music writers have described the song as "shockingly different" to the Kinks' recorded work up to this point, and a "frenetic lost gem". The song is included on a 1998 CD reissue of the group's debut album.

Upon release, the single received a positive review from Record Mirror, which said, "Highly promising group with strong guitar sound and a compact sort of vocal performance. Mid-tempo but bustling song should sell well." In Melody Maker, singer Dave Berry was featured in a blindfold test of the song, with Berry at first guessing the song was by the Kingsmen. He said, "It's fabulous, this one. I like these records that sound as if they've gone into a recording studio and done what they wanted to on the spot. It's a good chance of being a big hit." The Melody Maker review had a lasting impact on Ray Davies, who said that Berry "had a few hits – so he mattered" and that Berry's belief that the band had "done what they wanted" had "said it all" for him.  In the U.S., Cash Box described the single as "a pulsating, blues-flavored rock-a-rhythmic...that builds along the way."

The Kinks' use of distorted guitar riffs continued with songs like "All Day and All of the Night", "Tired of Waiting for You", and "Set Me Free", among others. Pete Townshend of the Who, a band also produced by Talmy at that time, has stated that their first single, "I Can't Explain", was influenced by the Kinks' work at the time. Other artists influenced by "You Really Got Me" include Tom Petty, John Lydon, Joe Jackson, Chris Bell of Big Star, and Jimi Hendrix, who, according to Dave Davies, described the song as "a landmark record".

In 1999, "You Really Got Me" was inducted into the Grammy Hall of Fame. Rolling Stone magazine placed the song at number 82 on their list of the 500 greatest songs of all time and at number four on their list of the 100 Greatest Guitar Songs of All Time. In early 2005, the song was voted the best British song of the 1955–1965 decade in a BBC radio poll. In March 2005, Q magazine placed it at number nine in its list of the 100 Greatest Guitar Tracks. In 2009, it was named the 57th Greatest Hard Rock Song by VH1.

Live history

Prior to its release, the Kinks performed "You Really Got Me" in some of their early concerts. It was a crowd favourite, with Ray Davies later claiming to feel a connection with the crowd as he performed the song. Ray later said, "Our success came from playing [the song] live. When we played 'You Really Got Me' people actually took notice. They realised we had something original."

The Kinks continued to perform successfully for over 30 years through many musical styles, but "You Really Got Me" remained a mainstay in concert. During some shows, the song was played in a medley with its follow-up single "All Day and All of the Night", while in 1977, a performance on Saturday Night Live featured a four-song medley of "You Really Got Me", "All Day and All of the Night", "A Well Respected Man", and "Lola". In a live performance on the Don Lane Show in 1982, "You Really Got Me" was featured in a medley with the band's 1981 song, "Destroyer". In 1984, Dave Davies claimed that, even after twenty years of performing "You Really Got Me", the track was "still fun to play live."

A live version of "You Really Got Me" was released on the band's 1980 live album, One for the Road. This version, following the minor success of the same album's live version of "Lola", was released as a single in America, backed with the live take of Low Budget's "Attitude". However, the single failed to chart. This version was later included on the 1986 compilation album, Come Dancing with the Kinks: The Best of the Kinks 1977–1986.

Other live renditions of "You Really Got Me" have also been released. A version on Live at Kelvin Hall recorded at Kelvin Hall in Glasgow, Scotland, was released in 1967, while a performance at the Mann Music Center in Philadelphia, Pennsylvania, appeared on 1994's To the Bone. The Davies brothers also performed a live version in Boston, Massachusetts with the Smithereens in November 1991, which later appeared on the latter band's 1995 compilation album Attack of the Smithereens. Both Ray and Dave Davies still perform the song in solo shows, generally as a closing number.

In December 2015, Ray Davies joined brother Dave onstage at one of his concerts to perform "You Really Got Me". The event marked the first time the brothers performed on stage together in nearly twenty years, sparking rumors of a possible Kinks reunion.

Personnel

According to Doug Hinman:

The Kinks
Ray Davies lead vocal, rhythm guitar
Dave Davies backing vocal, lead guitar
Pete Quaife backing vocal, bass
Mick Avory tambourine

Additional musicians
Bobby Graham drums
Arthur Greenslade piano
Unknown session musician rhythm guitar

Charts and certifications

Weekly charts

Year-end charts

Certifications

Van Halen version

The American hard rock band Van Halen released a cover of "You Really Got Me" for their 1978 debut album, Van Halen. As the band's first single, it was a popular radio hit that helped jump-start the band's career, as it had done for the Kinks 14 years earlier. This version, which was cited by Eddie Van Halen as an "updated" version of the original, featured "histrionic" guitar playing by Eddie Van Halen and "vocal shenanigans" by David Lee Roth. The song had been played by the band live for years before its studio release. On the radio, it is often featured with "Eruption", the instrumental that precedes it on the album, as an intro.

The song was released as a single as a result of an encounter between Eddie Van Halen and members of the band Angel. Eddie Van Halen and Angel drummer Barry Brandt had both been bragging about their new material to one another, resulting in Eddie Van Halen showing a demo of "You Really Got Me" to Brandt. On the following day, the band's producer, Ted Templeman told Van Halen that Angel was recording their own cover of "You Really Got Me" to release before Van Halen's version. As a result, the song was rush-released as a single before Angel could do so.

Record World said that it's a "supercharged, heavier version" than the Kinks' version and that "it's still a fine, primal rocker."

Eddie Van Halen later expressed dissatisfaction with the use of "You Really Got Me" as the band's debut single. He said, "It kind of bummed me out that Ted [Templeman] wanted our first single to be someone else's tune. I would have maybe picked "Jamie's Cryin, just because it was our own."

The Kinks' Dave Davies has claimed to dislike Van Halen's rendition of the song, saying "There's the thing: good art isn't always about having the comfiest technique. I shouldn't encourage him, but I'm sure Eddie Van Halen played better when he was drunk." He also told of how a concert-goer approached him after a live show and congratulated him on performing a "great cover of the Van Halen song". Ray Davies, on the other hand, claimed to like the track because it made him laugh.

Charts

See also
List of UK Singles Chart number ones of the 1960s

Notes

References
Citations

Bibliography

Further reading

External links

1964 songs
1964 singles
1978 debut singles
The Kinks songs
British garage rock songs
Arista Records singles
Number-one singles in New Zealand
Protopunk songs
Pye Records singles
Reprise Records singles
Song recordings produced by Shel Talmy
Song recordings produced by Ted Templeman
Songs written by Ray Davies
UK Singles Chart number-one singles
Van Halen songs
Warner Records singles